Kang Sung-hyung (born 7 May 1970) is a South Korean volleyball player. He competed in the men's tournament at the 1992 Summer Olympics.

References

1970 births
Living people
South Korean men's volleyball players
Olympic volleyball players of South Korea
Volleyball players at the 1992 Summer Olympics
Place of birth missing (living people)